Batu Hitam (literally: Black Stones) is a beach in Kuantan District, Pahang, Malaysia. It is called Batu Hitam for its stretch of black stones at the otherwise white sandy beach. Batu Hitam beach is one of the famous recreation place for the local residents and outsider.

See also
Teluk Cempedak
Cherating
Tanjung Sepat, Pahang

References

External links

 

Beaches of Malaysia
Kuantan District
Populated places in Pahang
Towns in Pahang